Stedum is a railway station located in Stedum, The Netherlands. The station was opened on 15 June 1884 and is located on the Groningen–Delfzijl railway. The train services are operated by Arriva.

Train service
The following services currently call at Stedum:
2x per hour local service (stoptrein) Groningen - Delfzijl

References

External links
 Stedum station, station information

Transport in Eemsdelta
Railway stations in Groningen (province)
Railway stations opened in 1884